"Easter Theatre" is a song written by Andy Partridge of the English rock band XTC, released as the lead single from their 1999 album Apple Venus Volume 1. According to Partridge, the lyrics were an attempt to match a "muddy" ascending chord progression. "There's the little melodic figure at the beginning, which I thought sounded medieval and earthy, combined with placid, droning high keyboard chords, which sound like you're floating—so it suggested floating over a land."

He considered "Easter Theatre" one of the few "perfect songs" of his career, feeling that he had "exorcized a lot of those kind of Lennon-and-McCartney, Bacharach-and-David, Brian Wilson type ghosts out of my system by doing all that." He jokingly apologized for "the fake Brian May guitar solo ... I thought it was really incongruous, but everyone thought I should leave it." Demo and instrumental versions of the song appear on Homespun (1999) and Instruvenus (2002), respectively.

Personnel
XTC
 Andy Partridge – vocals, guitar
 Colin Moulding – bass, backing vocals
 Dave Gregory – mellotron, acoustic guitar, keyboard programming

Additional performers 
 Prairie Prince – drums, percussion
 Steve Sidwell – trumpet

References

External links
 "Easter Theatre" on Chalkhills

1999 singles
XTC songs
Songs written by Andy Partridge
1999 songs
Easter songs